The Troggs (originally called the Troglodytes) are an English garage rock band formed in Andover, Hampshire in May 1964. Their most famous songs include the US chart-topper "Wild Thing", "With a Girl Like You" and "Love Is All Around", all of which sold over 1 million copies and were awarded gold discs. "Wild Thing" is ranked No. 257 on the Rolling Stone magazine's list of The 500 Greatest Songs of All Time and was an influence on garage rock and punk rock.

History
Reg Presley (lead vocals) and Ronnie Bond (drums) were childhood friends and in the early 1960s formed an R&B band in their home town of Andover. In 1964 they were joined by Pete Staples (bass) and Chris Britton (guitar) and became the Troggs. They were signed by Larry Page, manager of the Kinks, in 1965. They recorded on Page's Page One Records, and Page also leased them to CBS for the debut single "Lost Girl". Their most famous hit was the single "Wild Thing" (written by Chip Taylor) (the song on the B-side of the single depended on the country where it was sold) which, with the help of television exposure on Thank Your Lucky Stars, reached number 2 in the UK (b/w Reg Presley's song "From Home") and number 1 in the United States in July 1966. Its combination of a simple heavy guitar riff and flirtatious lyrics helped it to quickly become a garage rock standard.  It was recorded in one complete take (take two) at Olympic Studios in London, with Keith Grant engineering.  Because of a dispute over US distribution rights, "Wild Thing" was released (along with the first album of the same name) on two labels: Fontana and Atco. The band's success in the US was also limited by not touring there until 1968.

They also had a number of other hits, including "With a Girl Like You" (a UK number 1 in July 1966, US number 29), "I Can't Control Myself" (a UK number 2 in September 1966; their first UK single release on the Page One label, POF 001; this was also their second and final dual-label release in the US, with Fontana retaining the rights to all subsequent releases), "Any Way That You Want Me" (UK number 8 in December 1966), all at Olympic Studios, "Give It to Me" (UK No.12 1967), "Night of the Long Grass" (UK number 17 in May 1967), "Love Is All Around" (UK number 5 in November 1967 and US number 7 in May 1968) plus "Hi Hi Hazel" (UK No.42, 1967). The band's popularity completely waned the following year. Former Plastic Penny bassist Tony Murray replaced Pete Staples in 1969. Richard Moore filled in for Britton on their 1972–1973 tour. In 1974, after a spell on Pye Records, in an attempt to re-create their 1960s successes, the Troggs re-united with Larry Page, now running Penny Farthing Records. The resulting cover version of the Beach Boys hit "Good Vibrations" failed to chart. A reggae version of "Wild Thing" also failed. Richard Moore and Colin Fletcher substituted for Britton, who temporarily quit music to manage a night club in Spain, for the recording of The Troggs Tapes album released in 1976. The band found a sympathetic ear at French label New Rose in the 1980s, releasing the Black Bottom LP (1982) and AU (1990).

In 1991, they recorded Athens Andover, an 11-song collaboration between themselves and three members of R.E.M. It was recorded in the American band's hometown of Athens, Georgia, and was released in March 1992. The band attempted to capitalise on this new exposure with two collaborations on new versions of "Wild Thing". A 1992 recording with actor Oliver Reed and snooker player Alex Higgins failed to chart, but another version the following year featuring Wolf from the TV show Gladiators reached number 69 in the UK Singles Chart. In 1994, Wet Wet Wet's cover of "Love Is All Around" was No. 1 in the UK for 15 weeks, resulting in substantial royalties for Presley.

The band's original drummer, Ronnie Bond, died on 13 November 1992. In January 2012, Reg Presley retired after being diagnosed with lung cancer. The band carried on with new lead singer Chris Allen. Presley died on 4 February 2013.

Legacy and influence

The Troggs are widely seen as a highly influential band whose sound was an inspiration for garage rock and punk rock. Influential American critic Lester Bangs "called the band the progenitors of punk", according to NPR. For example, the Troggs influenced artists such as Iggy Pop, and the early version of British pop-punk pioneers Buzzcocks featured "I Can't Control Myself" in their live repertoire. The Ramones are also among the punk bands who cited the Troggs as an influence. "I Can't Control Myself" is perhaps the most enduring favourite of critics; it continues to be championed for its originality and lasting influence by radio hosts such as "Little" Steven Van Zandt.

A specially tailored version of "Give It to Me" featured in the "Sadie's Daydream" sequence of Michelangelo Antonioni's 1966 film Blowup. "I Can't Control Myself" appears at the climax of "The Little Chaos", the 1967 short film by German director Rainer Werner Fassbinder and in the "1967" episode of the 1996 British television serial Our Friends in the North.

"With a Girl Like You" is featured uncut in a school dance scene from the 1991 Nicole Kidman/Noah Taylor movie Flirting. It also is featured in Shine, The Good Night and The Boat That Rocked. "Wild Thing" is prominent in Jonathan Demme's 1986 film Something Wild. A modified version of "Love Is All Around" was featured in the film Love Actually (2003), performed by actor Bill Nighy. The Troggs was the name of the high school gang in the movie Bang Bang, You're Dead that persuade the main character to join them in attacking their high school. The point-and-click adventure game Hopkins FBI features "I Can't Control Myself" and "Lost Girl". Trogg is the name of one of Bane's three henchmen in Dennis O'Neil's Batman: Knightfall comic arc. The other henchmen are Bird and Zombie, named after two other popular 1960s rock bands: the Byrds and the Zombies.

The Jimi Hendrix Experience famously covered "Wild Thing" during their appearance at the 1967 Monterey Pop Festival, introducing it as the British/American joint "national anthem", and climaxing with Hendrix burning his guitar. MC5 covered "I Want You" at their live shows and recorded the song for the album Kick Out the Jams, although they renamed it "I Want You Right Now". In 1990, the first hit for (and first single by) the band Spiritualized was a cover of "Anyway That You Want Me". This cover later was used in the movie Me and You and Everyone We Know. In 1991, "Love Is All Around" was covered by R.E.M. during live performances and was released later that year as a B-side on their "Radio Song" single. They also performed an acoustic version of the song on MTV Unplugged. In 1994, Scottish band Wet Wet Wet's version of "Love Is All Around" spent 15 weeks at number one in the UK after its inclusion in Four Weddings and a Funeral. The authorship royalties enabled Reg Presley's 1990s research and publication on extraterrestrials and other paranormal phenomena. In 2012, Norwegian band Ulver covered the song "66-5-4-3-2-1" for their covers album Childhood's End. "Wild Thing" was covered by an ensemble featuring Queen guitarist Brian May to open the Wildlife Rocks' event at Guildford Cathedral in May 2014.

An in-studio tape of Reg Presley's running commentary on a recording session, filled with in-fighting and swearing (known as The Troggs Tapes), was widely circulated in the music underground, and was included in the Archaeology box set, as well as the compilation album, The Rhino Brothers Present the World's Worst Records. The group infighting is believed to be the inspiration for a scene in the comedy film This Is Spinal Tap, where the band members are arguing. Some of this dialogue was sampled by the California punk band the Dwarves on their recording of a cover version of the Troggs song "Strange Movies".

Band members

Current members
 Chris Britton – guitar, backing vocals (1964–1972, 1979–present; selected gigs only since 2017)
 Pete Lucas – bass, backing vocals (1979–present), rhythm guitar (1974)
 Chris Allen – lead vocals (2012–present)
 John W Doyle – guitar, backing vocals (2017–present)

Former members
 Reg Presley – lead vocals (1964–2012; died 2013)
 Ronnie Bond – drums (1964–1988; died 1992)
 Pete Staples – bass, backing vocals (1964–1969)
 Tony Murray – bass, backing vocals (1969–1977, 1979–1984)
 Richard Moore – lead guitar (1972–1979), rhythm guitar (1976–1979; died 2016)
 David Wright – rhythm guitar, backing vocals (1972–1974; died 2008)
 Colin Fletcher – rhythm guitar, backing vocals (1974–1976)
 Jo Burt – bass (1977–1979)
 Dave Maggs – drums (1988–2018)
 Darren Bond – drums (2018–2023)

Timeline

Discography

References

External links
 
 The Troggs Tapes
 Pete Staples Homepage
 PUNKCAST#79 live @ World Trade Center Plaza, New York – 24 July 2001. (RealPlayer)

 
Protopunk groups
Musical groups established in 1964
Beat groups
British Invasion artists
Fontana Records artists
Mercury Records artists
Atco Records artists
English rock music groups
1964 establishments in England
Musical quartets
Hansa Records artists